Ford Pier (born 1970) is a Canadian singer-songwriter. He was born in Boston, Massachusetts. His father is a professor of music. In addition to his solo albums, he has been a member of Jr. Gone Wild and D.O.A. as well as Roots Roundup. He has appeared as a guest musician on albums by Carolyn Mark, Martin Tielli, Showbusiness Giants, Veda Hille, Rheostatics, John Mann and Neko Case.

Personal life 
He resides in Vancouver.

Discography

 Meconium (1995)
 12-Step Plan, 11-Step Pier (1999)
 Besides (2000)
 Pier-ic Victory (2004)
 Organ Farming (2007)
 Adventurism (2009)
 Huzzah! (2012)

References

External links
 

1970 births
Canadian rock singers
Canadian singer-songwriters
Canadian rock guitarists
Canadian male guitarists
Living people
Canadian indie rock musicians
Six Shooter Records artists
D.O.A. (band) members
21st-century Canadian guitarists
21st-century Canadian male singers
Canadian male singer-songwriters